Trachypepla galaxias is a moth of the family Oecophoridae first described by Edward Meyrick in 1883. It is endemic to New Zealand and can be found throughout the country. This species inhabits native forest. The life history of this species is currently unknown. Adults are on the wing from October to February, are nocturnal and are attracted to light.

Taxonomy 
This species was first described by Edward Meyrick in 1883 and named Trachypepla galaxias using specimens collected at Hamilton, Wellington and at the Bealey River. Later that same year Meyrick gave another abbreviated description of the species. In 1884 Meyrick gave a much fuller description of T. galaxias. In 1928 George Hudson discussed and illustrated this species in his book The butterflies and moths of New Zealand. The male lectotype, collected in heath-like scrub and swamp in Hamilton, is held at the Natural History Museum, London.

Description 
 
Meyrick described this species as follows:

Distribution
This species is endemic to New Zealand and can be found throughout the country.

Behaviour
The adult moths of T. galaxias are on the wing from October to February. They are nocturnal and are attracted to light.

Habitat and hosts
The species inhabits native forest. As at 2014 the life history of this species is unknown, however the larvae of a related species, T. contritella, feed and pupates on lichen species in the genus Usnea. It has been hypothesised that the larvae of this species does similar.

References 

Moths described in 1883
Oecophoridae
Taxa named by Edward Meyrick
Moths of New Zealand
Endemic fauna of New Zealand
Endemic moths of New Zealand